Jan Tomasz Zamoyski (12 June 1912 in Klemensów – 29 June 2002 in Warsaw) was a Polish political activist. He was the 16th and last Ordynat of the Zamoyski Family Fee Tail, senator (1991–1993), president of the National-Democratic Party (since 1991). Awarded the Order of the White Eagle.

His efforts lead to the establishment of the Sacred Museum of the Zamość Cathedral in 1987.

After the collapse of the communist regime in 1989 he served as a member of the Senate of Poland in the Third Republic of Poland.

References

External links
 https://web.archive.org/web/20141106220359/http://roztocze.net/newsroom.php/11575

1912 births
2002 deaths
National-Democratic Party (Poland) politicians
Jan Tomasz Zamoyski
Members of the Senate of Poland 1991–1993
Home Army members
Recipients of the Order of the White Eagle (Poland)